James Armstrong OBE, FREng, FIStructE, FICE, FGS, MASCE was a British structural engineer born in 1947 in Cumbria and died in 2010.

Early life and education 
Armstrong was born in Cumbria in 1926 and read Civil engineering at the University of Glasgow.

Career 
After graduating in 1946, Armstrong undertook engineering training in Scotland in design and site supervision. He became head of foundations and special structures at Soil Mechanics Ltd (liquidated 2019).) In the early 1960s, he joined Harris & Sutherland (part of Jacobs Group since 2004) working on a prestressed concrete buoyant foundation for a sugar store in Guiana and the parabolic roof structure of the Commonwealth Institute in London. In 1963, he moved to BDP where he remained until he retired in 1989. He was head of civil and structural engineering and responsible for the Falklands airport, the Channel Tunnel terminal at Folkestone and gave expert evidence to Parliamentary Select Committees.

Armstrong was chairman of the buildings committee of the Harris Manchester College, Oxford where he was an Honorary  Fellow. As a member of the Education Committee of the  Royal Academy of Engineering he played a key role in setting up the Visiting Professors Group.
Armstrong was President of the Institution of Structural Engineers in 2009.

Awards and honours 
 OBE New Year Honours 1996 for services to engineering and education
 Visiting Professor Queen's University Belfast, Kingston Polytechnic & the University of Leeds, Cooper Union College, New York
 Hon DEng Kingston University

Selected publications 

 Design Matters: The Organisation and Principles of Engineering Design 2008

References 

Presidents of the Institution of Structural Engineers
People from Carlisle, Cumbria
20th-century births
2010 deaths
Officers of the Order of the British Empire
Fellows of the Institution of Civil Engineers
Fellows of the Geological Society of London
Alumni of the University of Glasgow
21st-century British engineers
Fellows of Harris Manchester College, Oxford
20th-century British engineers
People from the City of Carlisle
Cooper Union faculty